Robert Edward Harris (18 August 1860 – 30 May 1931) was a Canadian businessman, lawyer, and judge. He was the Chief Justice of Nova Scotia from 1918 until his death in 1931.

References
 http://www.biographi.ca/en/bio/harris_robert_edward_1F.html

Judges in Nova Scotia
1860 births
1931 deaths
Place of birth missing
Place of death missing